Events from the year 2004 in North Korea.

Incumbents
Premier: Pak Pong-ju 
Supreme Leader: Kim Jong-il

Events
 April 22 – Ryongchon disaster: Two trains carrying explosives and fuel collide in Ryongchon, North Korea, killing 161 people, injuring 1,300 and destroying thousands of homes.
 May 24 – North Korea bans mobile phones (see Communications in North Korea).

References

Further reading
 

 
North Korea
Years of the 21st century in North Korea
2000s in North Korea
North Korea